The Wild is a 2006 American computer-animated adventure comedy film directed by animator Steve "Spaz" Williams and written by Ed Decter, John J. Strauss, Mark Gibson and Philip Halprin. It features the voices of Eddie Izzard, Kiefer Sutherland, Janeane Garofalo, Jim Belushi, Richard Kind, Greg Cipes, and William Shatner.

Produced by Walt Disney Pictures, Hoytyboy Pictures, Sir Zip Studios and Contrafilm, it was animated by C.O.R.E. Feature Animation. It was released to theaters in North America on April 14, 2006, by Buena Vista Pictures and earned $102 million on an $80 million budget. It received largely negative reviews from critics, who criticized its animation style and similarities to DreamWorks Animation's Madagascar.

Plot
At the Central Park Zoo, Samson the lion tells his preteen son Ryan stories of his adventures in the Wilds of Africa. Ryan wants to go to the wild too to learn how to roar like his father, but Samson disapproves of the idea. When the zoo closes, all the animals are free to roam. Samson and his friends, Benny the squirrel, Bridget the giraffe whom Benny has a crush on, Larry the dim-witted anaconda, and Nigel the unlucky but popular koala compete in a turtle curling championship. Ryan and his own friends accidentally cause a stampede which heads to the game and endangers the animals. Samson and Ryan have a falling-out and Ryan runs off before Samson can apologize. He later sneaks into a green Intermodal container which is rumored to be heading to the wild. Just as he regrets his decision, Ryan suddenly gets locked inside the container, which is then loaded onto a freight truck, shipping him away.

With the help of a pigeon, Hamir, Samson, and his friends go after Ryan, hiding in a garbage disposal truck, but Benny falls overboard. After passing through Times Square and nearly being crushed in the truck, the group encounters a pack of rabid stray dogs, and instead of standing his ground, Samson escapes through the sewer rather than fighting as his friends expect for him to do. There, they take directions to the docks from two friendly streetwise alligator brothers, Stan and Carmine. The next morning, they steal a tugboat during a hectic escape from the harbor. After reuniting with Benny, who has followed them with a flock of Canada geese, Samson manages to drive the boat with Larry's help and the geese lead them to the right direction toward Ryan's ship.

A few days later the boat runs aground in Africa, where all the animals in the area are being evacuated by the carriers, as a nearby volcano is about to erupt. They witness Ryan run into the jungle, but Samson is unable to find him. After failing to eat a crude hyrax, his friend questions if he has ever been in the wild before, to which he forlornly confirms. The rest of the group heads back to the ship, but Samson continues to search for his son. While walking, he sees plants and rocks changing colors, which he attributes as his instincts working. Nigel is abducted by a herd of wildebeests who reside in the volcano and their leader Kazar, pronounces him "The Great Him," based on an "omen" he received when he was young: about to be devoured by lions, a toy koala fell from a plane and scared the lions away, saving his life. This experience made Kazar believe that "The Great Him" will help him and his kind create a change in the food chain that will allow prey to become predators and vice versa. In order to do that, he thinks the wildebeests have to eat a lion. Bridget and Larry are also get captured and planned to be eaten as well.

Ryan hides up an old tree, but a gang of vultures attacks him under Kazar's orders. The branch breaks and traps his paw. Samson hears Ryan's cries and runs to save him, scaring off the vultures. The two reunite but are interrupted by the wildebeests. Ryan is shocked when Samson tells him to run. They retreat to a tree where Samson reveals the truth about his past: he wasn’t born in anything but a circus and was unable to roar just like Ryan. Samson's overly-strict, authoritarian father could never accept him as a son and allowed him to be sent to the zoo, where he lied about his origins to avoid humiliation. The wildebeests discover them and push the tree over the cliff, with Samson still hanging on. Ryan is captured and taken to the volcano.

After a run-in with a group of female German dung beetles, Benny finds Samson and gives him the confidence to be himself, even if he is not from the wild. They soon find out that Samson's "instincts" were actually two chameleons named Cloak and Camo, who has been leading Samson to the volcano, so he would help them defeat Kazar's army. Samson uses the chameleons' camouflage abilities to sneak into the volcano, but when his disguise blows off due to the intense heat of the mountain, Kazar orders his army to attack. Seeing Samson in danger, Ryan climbs onto a catapulting device and launches himself at Kazar, finally letting out a roar. With Kazar distracted, Samson easily overpowers him. Ryan tells Samson that he is happy to have him as a father. The other wildebeests are touched by this and refuse to serve Kazar any further, having grown fed up with his delusions. Samson then gains the courage and roars powerfully enough to push back a charging Kazar. The group and the wildebeests flee, leaving Kazar to die in the erupting volcano. They manage to escape on the boat and travel back to the Central Park Zoo in their New York home.

Cast
 Kiefer Sutherland as Samson, a male lion, leader of the Central Park Zoo and the main protagonist of this film.
 Dominic Scott Kay as the voice of younger Samson
 Jim Belushi as Benny, a heroic Eastern gray squirrel who is Samson's best friend. He is the only one who knows about Samson's past.
 Eddie Izzard as Nigel, an eccentric British-accented koala and co-leader of the zoo. He has an intense loathing for the zoo's koala plushes portraying him as "cuddly".
 Janeane Garofalo as Bridget, an insecure reticulated giraffe. Benny has a crush on her, but she does not reciprocate until the end.
 Richard Kind as Larry, a dull-witted, but friendly green anaconda
 Greg Cipes as Ryan, an 11-year-old male lion cub, and Samson's son
 William Shatner as Kazar, a megalomaniacal male blue/black wildebeest hybrid and the main antagonist of the film. He is the tyrannical leader of a herd of wildebeests and seeks to change the food chain by eating an animal so that "Prey become Predators" and vice versa.
 Colin Hay as Fergus, an American flamingo
 Miles Marsico as Duke, a male teenage red kangaroo joey
 Jack DeSena as Eze, a male teenage hippopotamus calf
 Don Cherry as Penguin MC, a Southern rockhopper penguin
 Christian Argueta and David Cowgill as Hamir, a pigeon.
 Lenny Venito as Stan, a male American alligator
 Joseph Siravo as Carmine, a male American alligator
 Patrick Warburton as Blag, Kazar's right-hand man
 Colin Cunningham as Colin, a male hyrax
 Jonathan Kimmel and Eddie Gossling as Scab and Scraw, a pair of male Rüppell's vultures who serve as minions of Kazar.
 Kevin Michael Richardson as Jason, Samson's father and Ryan's grandfather
 Chris Edgerly as Cloak, a male common chameleon
 Bob Joles as Camo, a male Jackson's chameleon and the circus ringleader
 Greg Berg as a third unnamed vulture
 Bob Bergen as Donald, a pond slider turtle, a cheering black rhinoceros fan and several wildebeests
 Jason Connroy as a flamingo
 Debi Derryberry as Dung Beetle #3, Monkey Girl
 Terri Douglas as the Koala Toy, a pullstring koala plush which Nigel feuds with.
 Jeannie Elias as the monkeys
 Eddie Frierson as a penguin
 Jess Harnell as the garbage man and a sailor
 Jason Harris Katz as Victor, a Magellanic penguin
 Josh Keaton as a Rhino
 Carolyn Lawrence as Ladybird, Monkey Girl
 Danny Mann as the geese
 Mona Marshall as Woman, Lionesses and Dung Beetle #4 
 Paul Pape as Man #1 
 Fred Tatasciore as Victor, Man #2 
 Kari Wahlgren as Baby Hippo, Baby
 John Du Prez as several wildebeests
 Eric Idle as a wildebeest
 Miss Coco Peru as Mama Hippo

Non-Speaking characters including

 The Gazelles, a herd of Thomson's gazelles that Ryan accidentally causes to stampede.
 The Dogs, a Poodle, a Rottweiler and a Boxer, a pack of rabid stray dogs who were chasing after Samson and the gang.
 The Elephant, an African bush elephant who gets scared of Ryan by escaping out of the box.

Release
In March 2006, for a month-long "spring break" engagement exclusive to the El Capitan Theater, theater patrons were treated to a live performance of exotic birds which were accompanied by their keepers from the Los Angeles Zoo and Botanical Gardens before a screening of the film.

Home media
The film was released on DVD and VHS on September 12, 2006. The DVD was accompanied with a filmmakers' commentary, five deleted scenes, bloopers, and a music video of Everlife's "Real Wild Child". However, the VHS version was only an exclusive for the Disney Movie Club. On its first weekend, the film debuted at number one selling 787,779 DVD units. At the end of its initial home video release, the film earned $43.2 million. On November 21, 2006, the film was released on Blu-ray.

Reception

Box office
During its opening weekend, the film grossed $9.6 million at the box office, ranking fourth behind Scary Movie 4, Ice Age: The Meltdown, and The Benchwarmers. The Wild grossed $37.4 million in the United States and $64.9 million in other countries for a worldwide total of $102.3 million.

Critical response
On Rotten Tomatoes, the film has an approval rating of 19% based on 112 reviews and an average rating of 4.5/10. The site's critical consensus reads, "With a rehashed plot and unimpressive animation, there's nothing wild about The Wild." On Metacritic, the film has a score of 47 out of 100 based on 24 critics, indicating "mixed or average reviews". Audiences polled by CinemaScore gave the film an average grade of "B+" on an A+ to F scale.

Jonathan Rosenbaum of the Chicago Reader wrote that "The CGI characters seem less like artwork than humans wearing animal suits, but despite the overall ugliness and sitcom timing, this has enough action, violence, and invention to keep kids amused." Roger Ebert of the Chicago Sun-Times gave the film three stars out of four. He praised the film's animation, but acknowledged the film's realism ventured towards the uncanny valley. He remarked that the "framing of some of the characters is too close; they hog the foreground and obscure the background. And the fur, hair and feathers on the creatures look so detailed, thanks to the wonders of CGI, that once again we're wandering toward the Uncanny Valley."

Marc Savlov, reviewing for The Austin Chronicle, wrote "The animation is top-notch, and the film sports some of the most realistic and colorful fur, feathers, and hair this side of Fashion Week in Milan. However, The Wild feels as though much of its backstory, along with most of the good jokes, have been cut out along the circuitous path to your neighborhood cineplex, resulting in a finished film that will probably delight the under-10 set, while leaving everyone else marveling at how bored they are." Carrie Rickey of The Philadelphia Inquirer gave the film two stars out of four writing: "Though dull, there are three reasons one might want to see the film: The computer animators' ability to realistically represent animal fur is nothing short of dazzling. So detailed are the lion's mane and squirrel's tail that younger viewers could mistake it for a petting zoo."

Comparisons to Madagascar
Critics considered The Wild to be heavily derivative of the 2005 DreamWorks film, Madagascar. Claudia Puig, reviewing for USA Today, suggested that The Wild was "the most wildly derivative animated movie in ages. It borrows its theme from Finding Nemo and Cats & Dogs, copies elements of The Jungle Book, The Lion King and All Dogs Go To Heaven and has a shockingly similar plot to Madagascar." Similarly, Justin Chang of Variety felt "Samson's rescue mission directly channels the father-son Sturm und Drang of both The Lion King and Finding Nemo, though absent the former's powerhouse dramatics or the latter's eye-popping visual splendor." In summary, he wrote that "Uninspired character animation and obnoxious banter aside, The Wild is ultimately done in by the persistent stench of been-there-seen-that."

A few critics defended The Wild as the superior film. Michael Wilmington of the Chicago Tribune wrote "The Wild is better, mostly because it has some truly spectacular animation and because the cast is just as likable—even, in some cases, preferable." Mike Sage of the Peterborough This Week wrote "don't be mistaking this for a Madagascar rip off, when it was that sloppy DreamWorks turd that only managed to make it to theaters first because of corporate espionage". Without addressing which film was the original concept, Tim Cogshell of Boxoffice Magazine simply wrote "for the adult who may very well have to experience this film, and who may have experienced Madagascar, The Wild is better. The animation is better, the jokes intended for your children are better, the jokes intended for you and not your children are much better, the songs are better, and it's more fun."

Accolades

Soundtrack
The musical score is composed and conducted by Alan Silvestri who also composed Lilo & Stitch.
 "Real Wild Child" is performed by Everlife; a music video of the song is included on the DVD release of 2006. It was also included in the trailer of Wild Child.
 "Good Enough" is performed by Lifehouse
 "Clocks" is performed by Coldplay
 "Really Nice Day" is performed by Eric Idle and John Du Prez
 "Big Time Boppin' (Go Man Go)" is performed by Big Bad Voodoo Daddy
 "Lovin' You" is performed by Minnie Riperton.

The scores "Tales from the Wild", "You Can't Roar", and "Lost in the City" are only a few of the score tracks on the soundtrack. The soundtrack is available from Buena Vista Records. "Free Ride" by The Edgar Winter Group & "Come Sail Away" by Styx is featured in the trailers.

Video game
A video game for Game Boy Advance based on The Wild was released to coincide with the film. Players get to play as Benny the Squirrel and Samson the Lion as they go through New York, the sea, and Africa to find Ryan, while battling the wicked blue wildebeest Kazar. The video game is "E" rated (for "Everyone") by the ESRB, with a note for Mild Cartoon Violence.

Literature
 2006: Irene Trimble: Disney the Wild Novelisation, Parragon,

References

External links

  
 
 

2006 films
2006 animated films
2006 computer-animated films
2000s adventure comedy films
2000s American animated films
2000s children's comedy films
2000s English-language films
American adventure comedy films
American children's animated adventure films
American children's animated comedy films
American computer-animated films
Animated films about lions
Animated films about squirrels
Animated films about koalas
Films scored by Alan Silvestri
Films produced by Beau Flynn
Films about animals
Films set in Africa
Animated films set in New York City
Films set in zoos
Walt Disney Pictures animated films
2006 directorial debut films
2006 comedy films
Films about father–son relationships